Glanmire is an urban industrial locality in Gympie in the Gympie Region, Queensland, Australia.

Geography
It is bounded by the North Coast railway line to the northeast, Six Mile Creek to the east and southeast, Mary River to the south-west and Hall Road to the north-west. It contains the Gympie Industrial Estate.

History 
The locality was named after the town of Glanmire, County Cork, Ireland.

Road infrastructure
The Bruce Highway runs through from south to north.

Amenities 
Six Mile Oval which is host to the Gympie Cats, who play in the AFL Bundaberg-Wide Bay league.

Attractions 
The Six Mile Creek Rest Area is a grassed riverside reserve which contains barbecues and toilets allowing trucks and caravans to stop overnight.

References

Suburbs of Gympie
Localities in Queensland